Faldingworth is a village and civil parish in the West Lindsey district of Lincolnshire, England. Spridlington parish lies to the west, and Friesthorpe parish to the south-east. The 2001 census recorded a Faldingworth population of 253, increasing to 400 at the 2011 census.

Faldingworth Grade II listed Anglican church, dedicated to All Saints, was renovated in 1814 and again 1891. It seats 150 people. The Anglican parish dates from 1549, and is currently part of the Middle Rasen Group of parishes. The village formerly had a Methodist chapel, though this has now closed.

Faldingworth has a primary school serving the parishes of Faldingworth, Buslingthorpe, Newton, Freisthorpe and Snarford. A Council School was built in 1828, and was enlarged in 1876 and again in 1889.

The village also has the Coach and Horses public house and a village hall; its post office and village shop have closed.

RAF Faldingworth was used by Bomber Command during the Second World War, and although the station closed in 1972 parts of the airfield still exist. This was a Polish base, and a memorial to those who flew and failed to return is on the old airfield. There is also a memorial window and some memorabilia in the church.

References

External links

Villages in Lincolnshire
Civil parishes in Lincolnshire
West Lindsey District